Pinoy baiting is the act engaged by non-Filipino individuals, usually celebrities or YouTubers, who post content online with the intention of getting the attention of Filipinos, by acting surprised, giving superficial and insincere praises, and other forms that gives supposed recognition to the Philippines or its people.

Such actions and subsequent responses by Filipinos have been criticized as a form of cultural cringe, and that Filipinos should not constantly require validation from non-Filipinos about themselves or their country.

Forms of Pinoy baiting

Reaction videos
On social media such as YouTube, channels with the specific focus to show their reaction and opinions about a certain video or topic are called reaction channels. Reactions are very popular and require minimal effort to create, this makes it the reason why it is very easy for Pinoy baiting channels to thrive out of reaction videos.

Vlog
Vlogging, short for Video blogging, grew in popularity in recent years. Most of the popular Pinoy baiting channels tend to be vlog channels, normally following the same title and script, which include: "The Philippines changed us/me", "First impression of the Philippines", "Is this really Manila?" "Filipinos are such Kind/Good People!", as well as travelling to touristy areas such as Boracay, Bonifacio Global City and test tasting the fast food chain Jollibee, among others.

See also

Colonial mentality
Cultural cringe
Orientalism
Postcolonialism
Self-hatred
Tall poppy syndrome

References 

Cultural studies
Society of the Philippines
Social media
Internet in the Philippines